Lenni Killinen is a Finnish ice hockey player who plays for Lahti Pelicans on season 2022-2023 in Liiga.

Career 
In 2018 Lenni Killinen was drafted 104th overall by the Carolina Hurricanes. He played for Kiekko Espoo U20 that season. He played for Kiekko Espoo U20 38 games and 41 points. Overall he has played 112 games in Ässät with 39 points and 7 games in the World Junior Championships with 2 points.

References 

Living people
2000 births
Finnish ice hockey left wingers
Finnish ice hockey right wingers
Ässät players
Carolina Hurricanes draft picks
Sportspeople from Espoo